Morgan Creek Entertainment is an American film production company that has released box-office hits including Young Guns, Dead Ringers, Major League, True Romance, Ace Ventura: Pet Detective, The Crush, Robin Hood: Prince of Thieves and The Last of the Mohicans. The studio was co-founded in 1987 by James G. Robinson and Joe Roth. Robinson leads the company as chairman and CEO. His two sons, Brian Robinson and David C. Robinson, run the day-to-day operations. The company name comes from Roth's favorite film, The Miracle of Morgan's Creek.

Morgan Creek generally releases their films through larger studios while retaining the copyrights, and making autonomous decisions on home video and television rights. Their initial slate of films from 1988 to 1990 were released by 20th Century Fox, except for Renegades and Coupe de Ville which were released by Universal and Major League which was released by Paramount, and some home video releases of its early titles going to Media Home Entertainment. In 1991, beginning with Robin Hood: Prince of Thieves, they shifted their distribution of new films, as well as their previous catalog titles, to Warner Bros., where they remained until early 2005. Later that year, beginning with Two for the Money, they released their newer films through Universal, though previous films were still handled in the U.S. by Warner.

On July 11, 1997, Gary Barber announced that he would leave the studio, and he subsequently went on to start out Spyglass Entertainment. In 1998, Morgan Creek had a distribution deal with Warner Home Video to release its product through the Morgan Creek Video and the Morgan Creek DVD labels.

On October 8, 1998, Morgan Creek and Franchise Pictures entered into an agreement where Morgan Creek would distribute Franchise's upcoming pictures domestically. On July 2, 2001, Morgan Creek Productions sued Franchise Pictures for allegedly breaching an agreement giving the company the right of first refusal on some films.

In October 2014, Morgan Creek sold the international distribution rights and copyrights to their films to Revolution Studios for $36.75 million. In September 2015, Morgan Creek began negotiating the sale of rights for the remaining territories, though they intend to retain remake and television rights to the Ace Ventura, Major League, Young Guns, and Exorcist franchises.

List of Morgan Creek films

List of Morgan Creek television series 
 Ace Ventura: Pet Detective (1995–2000) (with Nelvana and Warner Bros. Television)
 The Exorcist (2016–2017) (with New Neighborhood and 20th Century Fox Television)
 The Good Shepherd (with Showtime)
 Dead Ringers (with Amazon Studios and Annapurna Television)
 Nightbreed
 Pacific Heights

References

External links 
 
 Company profile on Yahoo Finance

 
Film production companies of the United States
Entertainment companies based in California
Companies based in Santa Monica, California
Entertainment companies established in 1988
1988 establishments in California